Heatley is a surname of both English and Scottish origin. 

There appear to be several English origins of Heatley. 

The earliest references to the surname in Scotland are in the 11th century in the Borders region. The de Haitlie family held the lands where Mellerstain Castle is now situated. The lands of Mellerstain seem to have been closely linked to those of Fans and are mentioned in the early 13th century when they seem to have been subdivided into tofts which were owned by the de Hattely or de Haitley family, Richard of Fans and his half-brother David de Graham, amongst others. Grants and donations of land at Mellerstain were made to both Durham Priory and Kelso Abbey, and some time between 1265 and 1285 William de Hattely granted the abbot of Kelso the right to pass through his lands of Meloustan (Mellerstain) and permission to build a bridge over the Blackburn above his house. 

The spelling of the Scottish Heatley surname has evolved over the centuries and has taken on various spellings. The Scottish lineage of the Heatley surname belong to YDNA haplogroup R-FGC20613 (www.familytreedna.com). It appears to have been in Scotland for thousands of years. 

Notable people with the surname include:

Basil Heatley (1933–2019), British athlete
Bill Heatley (1920–1971), Australian politician
Bob Heatley (1895–1973), Australian footballer
Craig Heatley (born 1956), New Zealand businessman
Danny Heatley:
Danny Heatley (musician), British drummer
Dany Heatley (born 1981), Canadian ice hockey player
David Heatley (born 1974), American cartoonist
Frederick Heatley (c1934-2017) Founder of the Northern Ireland Civil Rights Association (NICRA) and Historian
Jason Heatley (born 1972), Australian footballer
Johnny Rock Heatley, American guitarist
Murray Heatley (born 1948), former Canadian ice hockey player
Michael Heatley, Author
Norman George Heatley (1911–2004), British biochemist, Penicillin co-discoverer
Philip Reeve Heatley (born 1967), New Zealand politician
Ramsay Heatley Traquair (1840–1912), Scottish naturalist
Spike Heatley (1933–2021), British jazz bassist
Sue Heatley Artist
Sue L. Heatley Australian Geneticist
Tamsin Heatley, British actress
William G Heatley American poet

See also
Heatley & Warburton railway station